Cornelius Sergius Geddy is an Indonesian footballer who currently plays for Perseru Serui in the Indonesian Super League as a striker.

International career
In 2007, he played to represent the Indonesia U-23, in 2007 SEA Games.

References
 

Specific

External links

Indonesian footballers
1986 births
Living people
Indonesian Christians
People from Jayapura
Persisam Putra Samarinda players
Persiram Raja Ampat players
Bontang F.C. players
Perseru Serui players
Badak Lampung F.C. players
Persija Jakarta players
Persija Jakarta (IPL) players
Indonesian Premier League players
Association football forwards
Indonesia international footballers
Sportspeople from Papua